Castle Square may refer to:

Castle Square, Sheffield, England
Castle Square, Warsaw, Poland
Castle Square, Beirut, Lebanon

See also 
 Castle Street (disambiguation)
 Schloßplatz (disambiguation)